Amara Walker or Amara Sohn-Walker (née Sohn) is an American journalist and a news anchor for CNN This Morning Weekend.  She is also a correspondent on CNN. Since joining the network in 2014, she has anchored numerous hours of breaking news.

Early life and education
Walker, who is a Korean American, was born and raised outside Los Angeles. In 2003, she graduated from the University of Southern California with a double degree in broadcast journalism and political science.

Career
Walker started her career at KMIR-TV in Palm Springs. In 2005, Walker joined the NBC-owned WTVJ in Miami, Florida, where she worked as a news anchor and a general assignment reporter.

In July 2012, Walker transferred her roles as a news anchor and a general assignment reporter to the Fox-owned WFLD in Chicago, Illinois after moving there with her husband. In December 2013, Walker departed WFLD and moved to Atlanta, Georgia, with her husband, where she joined CNN International. From 2015 to 2020, Walker anchored a three-hour daily news program on CNN International's CNN Today with colleague Michael Holmes.

In March 2021, Walker reported on air that she had been the victim of anti-East Asian insults. In February 2022, she published an opinion piece about violence against East Asian-American women. On October 8, 2022, she was officially named co-anchor of New Day Weekend, now CNN This Morning Weekend.

Personal life
In April 2012, Walker married otolaryngologist and facial plastic surgeon Thomas Walker in Austria. Aside from her native English, she also speaks Spanish and Korean, although Walker has stated that her Korean is not proficient.

References

External links
Amara Walker's profile on CNN.com

American people of Korean descent
Television anchors from Chicago
American television reporters and correspondents
CNN people
Journalists from California
Living people
NBC News people
University of Southern California alumni
1981 births
People from Los Angeles
Television anchors from Miami